"I'm Still Waiting" is a popular song, written and produced by Deke Richards and recorded by Diana Ross; it first appeared on Ross's 1970 album Everything Is Everything. The song reached No. 1 on the UK Singles Chart in August 1971. It also reached number one in Ireland.

"I'm Still Waiting" continued the vein of sophisticated soul as heard on Ross's breakthrough solo hit "Ain't No Mountain High Enough". However, it was only a modest success in the US, reaching No. 63 on the Billboard Hot 100 singles chart, and No. 40 on the R&B chart.

Although it was initially intended only as an album track, BBC Radio 1 disc jockey Tony Blackburn featured it heavily on his morning programme, and persuaded EMI—which at the time issued all Tamla Motown material in the UK—to release it as a single. It reached No. 1 on the UK Singles Chart for four weeks in August 1971; this prompted a retitling in the UK of the album Surrender as I'm Still Waiting.

Chart history

Weekly charts

Year-end charts

1990 remix
The track was remixed by DJ Phil Chill in 1990 and was released as a single, reaching No. 21 in the UK Singles Chart. It is one of the few Ross remix songs to be released as a single.

Charts

Cover versions
Former Supreme Scherrie Payne later covered this song for Ian Levine's UK Motorcity label.

Courtney Pine and Carroll Thompson had a minor UK hit single with the song in July 1990.

Chinese diva Faye Wong also covered the song (named as 又继续等), with Cantonese lyrics by Richard Lam, on her early album You're the Only One.  This cover was based on Pine and Thompson's remix.

Laura Mvula released a version of the song in February 2021 on her 1/f EP.

References

External links
 

1971 singles
Diana Ross songs
Motown singles
Irish Singles Chart number-one singles
UK Singles Chart number-one singles
Songs written by Deke Richards
Faye Wong songs
1970 songs